Mampang Prapatan is a district of South Jakarta, one of the five administrative cities which forms the special capital region of Jakarta, Indonesia. The expatriate residential areas of Bangka and Kemang, known for its annual Kemang Festival, are located in Mampang Prapatan District. The boundaries of Mampang Prapatan are: Krukut River to the west, Cideng River and Mampang River to the east, Jalan Jenderal Gatot Subroto Tollway to the north, and Kemang Selatan-Kemang Timur Road to the south.
Mampang Prapatan Main Road passed through Mampang Prapatan District. Expatriate neighborhood partly located Kemang in this district.

Kelurahan (Administrative Villages)
The district of Mampang Prapatan is divided into five kelurahan or administrative villages: 
Kuningan Barat - area code 12710
Pela Mampang - area code 12720
Bangka - area code 12730
Tegal Parang - area code 12790
Mampang Prapatan - area code 12790

List of important places
Kemang
Lippo Mall Kemang
Al Barkah Mosque, built in 1818, one of the few mosques built in traditional Javanese architecture
Indonesian Institute of Sciences
Museum TNI-AD "Satria Mandala", or Satria Mandala Museum
Trans Media (Trans TV, Trans7, CNN Indonesia and CNBC Indonesia) headquarter

References

Districts of Jakarta
South Jakarta